Pilania is a surname. Notable people with the surname include:

 Naveen Pilania, Indian politician and member of the National People's Party
 Gyan Prakash Pilania (born 1932), Indian politician from Rajasthan

Surnames of Indian origin